Julia Lutrova (born 9 January 1975) is a former Russian tennis player.

Lutrova won three singles and three doubles titles on the ITF tour in her career. On 17 June 1996, she reached her best singles ranking of world number 182. On 7 October 1996, she peaked at world number 124 in the doubles rankings.

Lutrova made two appearances for the Russia Fed Cup team in 1994. Two years later she reached the second round of women's doubles at the 1996 Wimbledon Championships.

ITF finals (6–10)

Singles (3–7)

Doubles (3–3)

Fed Cup participation

Doubles

References 
 
 
 

1975 births
Living people
Russian female tennis players
20th-century Russian women
21st-century Russian women